Game Time is the second studio album by American rapper Lil' Romeo. It was released on December 17, 2002 on The New No Limit and Universal Records. The album peaked at number 33 on the Billboard 200 and had first week sales of 93,000 copies.

Critical reception

Dan LeRoy from AllMusic found the album "overlong and musically malnourished" with its track listing and overuse of lazy sampling but gave credit to Romeo's charm on songs like "True Love" and "2-Way", concluding that he should follow in the footsteps of Will Smith and go into acting instead. Jon Caramanica, writing for Rolling Stone, said that Game Time "doesn't have much to recommend it, but if nothing else, Romeo has got his target demo on lock." Robert Ford of Entertainment Weekly felt throughout the album that "an overabundance of samples and fluff, not to mention unskilled flow, proves Romeo is still lil’ league."

Track listing

Sample credits
 "Too Long" contains a sample of "I Wanna Be Where You Are" by Michael Jackson
 "True Love" contains a sample of "So Amazing" by Luther Vandross
 "Girlfriend and Boyfriend" contains a sample of "Friends" by Whodini
 "Wanna Grow Up" contains a sample of "I Won't Grow Up" from the musical Peter Pan
 "Still Be There" contains a sample of "Young Love" by Teena Marie
 "Richie Rich" contains a sample of "I Got It Made" by Special Ed
 "Make You Dance" contains samples of "Angel of the Morning" by Chip Taylor and "That's the Way (I Like It)" by KC and the Sunshine Band
 "2-Way" contains samples of "Think (About It)" performed by Lyn Collins and "It Takes Two" by Rob Base & DJ E-Z Rock
 "We Can Make It Right" contains a sample of "It's the Hard Knock Life" from the musical Annie

Personnel
Adapted from the liner notes of Game Time.

Myke Diesel – engineering, mixing (tracks 1, 2, 4-7, 11, 16, 19)
The Beat Boyz – engineering, mixing (tracks 3, 9, 13, 14), background vocals (track 13)
Carlos Stephens – engineering, mixing (tracks 8, 12, 15)
Anthony President – engineering, mixing (track 18)
Branz Dimilo – engineering, mixing (track 18)
Bernie Grundman – mastering
Chris Bellman – mastering
Robin Hill – sample clearance services
Tim Alexander – photos

Charts

Weekly charts

Year-end charts

References

2002 albums
No Limit Records albums
Romeo Miller albums
Universal Records albums